Joey Raia is a New York-based mix engineer. He is known for his work with Run The Jewels, Aesop Rock, Nick Hook, Mac Miller and El-P. In 2017 he was nominated for the 2018 Grammy Awards in the category of "Best Rap Song" for mixing "Chase Me" by Dangermouse featuring Run The Jewels and Big Boi. Raia's mixes have also been featured in soundtracks including Frozen, Moana, Baby Driver and EA Sports' FIFA 2018.

Raia began his career designing audio electronics for Apogee and would later become an apprentice of the multi-Grammy winning producer, engineer and mixer Bob Clearmountain. He currently works from his private production and mix production studio in Dobbs Ferry, New York. The room was custom designed by veteran studio designer Francis Manzella. Raia is managed by Global Positioning Services management.

Discography

References

Musicians from New York (state)
Living people
Year of birth missing (living people)